Diane J. Savino (born September 28, 1963) is an American Democratic politician who represented the 23rd Senate District in the New York State Senate, in northern Staten Island and parts of southern Brooklyn, including Sunset Park, Bay Ridge, Bath Beach, Brighton Beach, and Coney Island. She currently serves as a Senior Advisor to New York City Mayor, Eric Adams.

From January 2011 to April 2018, Savino was a member of the Independent Democratic Conference, a group of eight Democratic state senators who formed a separate conference and allied themselves with Senate Republicans. Savino and her IDC colleagues rejoined the Senate Democratic Conference in April 2018. Savino was one of only two former members of the IDC that survived primary challenges in the 2018 New York Senate elections.

Early life and career
Savino was born in Astoria, Queens and went on to graduate from Dominican Commercial High School.  She has a psychology degree from St. John's University as well as a degree in Industrial and Labor Relations from Cornell.

Prior to elected office, Savino began her career in public service as a caseworker for New York City's Administration for Children's Services, providing direct assistance to abused and neglected children. She was an active member of her local labor union, the Social Service Employees Union, Local 371, DC 37 of AFSCME, and became the Vice President for Political Action & Legislative Affairs.

State Senate career

In 2004, Savino was elected to represent the 23rd Senatorial District. She succeeded longtime Senator Seymour P. Lachman, who had retired.

On December 2, 2009, Savino voted for same-sex marriage legislation, which failed to pass the Senate. Her speech on same-sex marriage became popular on the Internet. Subsequently, in 2011, the Marriage Equality Act passed the Senate and became law; Savino voted for this bill as well.

In 2011, Savino—together with Democratic Sens. Jeffrey D. Klein, David J. Valesky, and David Carlucci—formed the Independent Democratic Conference (IDC). The IDC caucused separately from the other State Senate Democrats; eventually, in December 2012, the IDC entered into a power-sharing arrangement with Senate Republicans. When the Republican Conference won enough seats for outright control of the Senate in 2014, Savino and the rest of the IDC chose to remain aligned with them.

As a member of the IDC, Savino was provided with a stipend, known as a "lulu", worth $13,500 per year that is designated by Legislative Law 5-1 for the Chair of the Senate Codes Committee. Senate Republicans named her Vice Chair of that committee, reserving the chairmanship for a Republican; in order to provide the stipend to Savino, payroll officials falsified state documents.

In 2014, medical marijuana was legalized in New York; Savino was the lead sponsor of that legislation. Savino has also sponsored proposed legislation that would legalize physician-assisted suicide.

Savino and her IDC colleagues rejoined the Senate Democratic Conference in April 2018. In the 2018 Democratic Primary, Savino defeated Jasmine Robinson, a legal secretary who had been endorsed by the progressive groups Citizen Action of New York and Our Revolution, by a 67-21% margin. Savino was one of only two former IDC members (along with David Carlucci) to win their primary races.  In the 2018 general election, Savino defeated her Republican opponent, David Krainert, by a 69-28% margin.

In early 2022, Savino stated that she supported the creation of a new congressional district in Brooklyn which consists of Asian-American voting residential majority.  As of January 2023, the new New York State Senate district that she represented includes the neighborhood of Red Hook. Other sections of her district in Brooklyn were removed.

Savino has announced that she will not be running for reelection to the state senate in 2022.

Election results
 Savino was first elected to the State Senate in 2004 with 39,833 votes; her Republican opponent, Al Curtis, received 23,361 votes.
 In 2008, Savino was re-elected with 46,386 votes. Her Republican opponent, Richard Thomas, received 12,621 votes.
 In 2010, Savino was unopposed in the general election.
 In 2012, Savino was re-elected with 50,553 votes; her Republican opponent, Lisa Grey, received 15,131 votes.
 In 2014, Savino was unopposed in the general election.
 In 2016, Savino was unopposed in the primary and general election.
 In 2018, Savino won the Democratic nomination with 67% of the votes cast.  She won the general election with 69% of the votes cast.

Personal life
As of 2018, Savino was in a long-term relationship with then-State Senator Jeffrey Klein. The Italian-American politician is known for her early to bed, early to rise lifestyle. She lives by herself in Staten Island.  She is a self-admitted "neurotic cleaner". New York politician Matthew Titone once tricked her into cleaning his apartment.

See also
 2009 New York State Senate leadership crisis

References

External links
 New York State Senate: Diane J. Savino
 Ballotpedia: Diane Savino

|-

Living people
American people of Italian descent
American LGBT rights activists
Democratic Party New York (state) state senators
People from Staten Island
Women state legislators in New York (state)
1963 births
Activists from New York (state)
21st-century American politicians
21st-century American women politicians
Independent Democratic Conference